Tsogt-Ochiryn Namuuntsetseg (born 31 March 1996) is a Mongolian freestyle wrestler.  

She competed at the 2019 World Wrestling Championships, and 2021 Asian Wrestling Olympic Qualification Tournament.
In 2020, she qualified for the 2020 Summer Olympics in Tokyo, Japan. She competed in the women's 50 kg event.

She won the silver medal in her event at the 2022 Asian Wrestling Championships held in Ulaanbaatar, Mongolia.

References

External links 

 

Living people
Mongolian female sport wrestlers
Wrestlers at the 2020 Summer Olympics
1996 births
Olympic wrestlers of Mongolia
Asian Wrestling Championships medalists
21st-century Mongolian women